Matudanthus is a genus of monocotyledonous flowering plants in the dayflower family and was first described in 1978. The genus is monotypic and contains the single species Matudanthus nanus, which is endemic to the State of Oaxaca in southern Mexico.

Etymology 
The genus name of Matudanthus is in honour of Eizi Matuda (1894–1978), who was a Mexican botanist of Japanese origin.

References

 

Commelinaceae
Monotypic Commelinales genera
Flora of Oaxaca